Guillermo Algaze (born November 24, 1954) is a Cuban-born American anthropologist and recipient of a 2003 MacArthur Award,
Algaze is a former chair of the anthropology department at University of California, San Diego, and project director of the Titris Hoyuk excavation in southern Turkey.

Life and education
Algaze was born on November 24, 1954, in Havana, Cuba, and was raised in Puerto Rico. He graduated from the University of Puerto Rico in 1976. Algaze later moved to the continental United States, and became a citizen. In 1986, he earned his doctorate from the University of Chicago. He joined the University of California, San Diego faculty in 1990, he taught there as a professor for several years and currently serves as the chair of the anthropology department.

Academic work
Algaze's archaeological interests have mostly been around Mesopotamian history and culture. His work has contributed to a vast amount of information in relation to Mesopotamia. In the 1990s, Algaze was a major proponent of an anthropological theory on the spread of civilisation from the Euphrates valley area and ancient Mesopotamia, arguing that colonial expansion from south to north (from the area that is currently southern Iraq) was responsible for the establishment of city-states in northern Iraq and Syria and southeastern Turkey. Following discoveries in the new millennium, Algaze says he has been "eating a lot of crow", acknowledging that evidence suggests societies in the northern area emerged simultaneously and independently of the Mesopotamian expansion.

In 2003 he received the MacArthur Genius Award, for his work studying the imperialism and colonialism of ancient civilizations, particularly the Uruk expansion in ancient Mesopotamia.

List of works

References

Bibliography
 
 

1954 births
Living people
People from Havana
Cuban anthropologists
University of California, San Diego faculty
MacArthur Fellows